Pope Clement IV (23 November 1190 – 29 November 1268), born Gui Foucois (or ) and also known as Guy le Gros (French for "Guy the Fat"), was bishop of Le Puy (1257–1260), archbishop of Narbonne (1259–1261), cardinal of Sabina (1261–1265), and head of the Catholic Church from 5 February 1265 until his death. His election as pope occurred at a conclave held at Perugia that lasted four months while cardinals argued over whether to call in Charles I of Anjou, the youngest brother of Louis IX of France, to carry on the papal war against the Hohenstaufens. Pope Clement was a patron of Thomas Aquinas and of Roger Bacon, encouraging Bacon in the writing of his Opus Majus, which included important treatises on optics and the scientific method.

Early life
Clement was born in Saint-Gilles-du-Gard in the Languedoc region of France, to a successful lawyer, Pierre Foucois, and his wife Marguerite Ruffi. At the age of nineteen, he enrolled as a soldier to fight the Moors in Spain. He then pursued the study of law in Toulouse, Bourges and Orleans, becoming a noted advocate in Paris. In the latter capacity he acted as secretary to King Louis IX, to whose influence he was chiefly indebted for his elevation to the cardinalate. He married the daughter of Simon de Malbois and had two daughters. Upon the death of his wife, he followed his father's example and gave up secular life for the Church.

His rise was rapid. Ordained in the abbey of Saint-Magloire, Paris, he became pastor of Saint-Gilles in 1255. In 1257, he was appointed Bishop of Le Puy; in 1259, he was appointed Archbishop of Narbonne; and in December 1261, he became the first cardinal created by Pope Urban IV, for the See of Sabina. He was the papal legate in England between 1262 and 1264. He was named a cardinal (grand penitentiary) in 1263.

Pontificate
In this period, the See of Rome was engaged in a conflict with Manfred, King of Sicily, the illegitimate son and designated heir of Holy Roman Emperor Frederick II of Hohenstaufen, but whom papal loyalists, the Guelfs, called "the usurper of Naples". Clement IV, who was in France at the time of his election, was compelled to enter Italy in disguise. He immediately took steps to ally himself with Charles of Anjou, his erstwhile patron's brother and the impecunious French claimant to the Neapolitan throne. Charles was willing to recognize the Pope as his feudal overlord (a bone of contention with the Hohenstaufens) and was crowned by cardinals in Rome, where Clement IV, permanently established at Viterbo, dared not venture, since the anti-papal Ghibelline party was so firmly in control there.

Then, fortified with papal money and supplies, Charles marched into Naples. Having defeated and slain Manfred in the great Battle of Benevento, Charles established himself firmly in the kingdom of Sicily at the conclusive Battle of Tagliacozzo, in which Conradin, the last of the house of Hohenstaufen, was taken prisoner. Clement IV is said to have disapproved of the cruelties committed by his protégé, but the statement by Gregorovius that Clement IV became an accomplice by refusing to intercede for the unfortunate Conradin whom Charles had beheaded in the marketplace of Naples seems contentious. However, Gregorovius may be basing this conclusion on the position of Urban IV's predecessors, Innocent IV and Alexander IV, who were Conradin's official guardians.

Acts

In 1264, Clement IV renewed the prohibition of the Talmud promulgated by Gregory IX, who had it publicly burnt in France and in Italy. Though Clement did not condemn to death at the stake those who harboured copies of it, and, responding to a denunciation of the Talmud by Pablo Christiani, he ordered that the Jews of Aragon submit their books to Dominican censors for expurgation.

In February 1265 Clement summoned Thomas Aquinas to Rome to serve as papal theologian.  It was during this period that Aquinas also served as regent master for the Dominicans at Rome.  With the arrival of Aquinas the existing studium conventuale at Santa Sabina, which had been founded in 1222, was transformed into the Order's first studium provinciale featuring the study of philosophy (studia philosophiae) as prescribed by Aquinas and others at the chapter of Valenciennes in 1259, an intermediate school between the studium conventuale and the studium generale.  This studium was the forerunner of the 16th century College of Saint Thomas at Santa Maria sopra Minerva and the Pontifical University of Saint Thomas Aquinas, Angelicum. In 1266, after the Battle of Benevento, Pope Clement IV conceded for gratitude his coat of arms to the Guelph Party of Florence as official approval to their supremacy and therefore they could take power in many of the other northern Italian cities. In 1267–68 Clement engaged in correspondence with the Mongol Ilkhanate rule Abaqa. The latter proposed a Franco-Mongol alliance between his forces, those of the West, and the Byzantine emperor Michael VIII Palaeologos (Abaqa's father-in-law). Pope Clement welcomed Abaqa's proposal in a non-committal manner, but did inform him of an upcoming Crusade. In 1267, Pope Clement IV and King James I of Aragon sent an ambassador to the Mongol ruler Abaqa in the person of Jayme Alaric de Perpignan. In his 1267 letter written from Viterbo, the Pope wrote:

Although Clement's successors continued to engage in diplomatic contacts with the Mongols for the rest of the century, they were never able to coordinate an actual alliance.

Death and burial

Within months Clement IV was dead as well, and was buried at the Dominican convent, Santa Maria in Gradi, just outside Viterbo, where he resided throughout his pontificate. In 1885, his remains were transferred to the church, San Francesco alla Rocca, in Viterbo. Owing to irreconcilable divisions among the cardinals, the papal throne remained vacant for nearly three years.

Clement IV's private character was praised by contemporaries for his asceticism, and he is especially commended for his indisposition to promote and enrich his own relatives. He also ordered the Franciscan scholar Roger Bacon to write the Opus Majus, which is addressed to him.

See also

List of popes

References

Citations

Bibliography

 

 Jean Dunbabin, Charles I of Anjou: Power, Kingship and State-Making in Thirteenth-Century Europe (Addison Wesley Longman 1998; London-New York: Routledge 2014).

External links

 "Le pape, le roy et l'alchimiste : Clémént IV – saint Louis – Roger Bacon" by Laurent Ryder

1195 births
1268 deaths
People from Saint-Gilles, Gard
Cardinals created by Pope Urban IV
Popes
French popes
Diplomats of the Holy See
Cardinal-bishops of Sabina
Bishops of Le Puy-en-Velay
Archbishops of Narbonne
13th-century Roman Catholic archbishops in France
Major Penitentiaries of the Apostolic Penitentiary
Viterbo Papacy
Year of birth unknown
13th-century popes